Bart Mollin (born 6 March 1981) is an alpine skier from Belgium.  He competed for Belgium at the 2010 Winter Olympics where he failed to finish the first run of the slalom.

References

External links
 
 

1981 births
Living people
Belgian male alpine skiers
Olympic alpine skiers of Belgium
Alpine skiers at the 2010 Winter Olympics